Bemis is an unincorporated community in Randolph County, West Virginia, United States.

The community has the name of Harry Bemis, a businessperson in the lumber industry.

References

Unincorporated communities in Randolph County, West Virginia
Unincorporated communities in West Virginia